Bathynerita is a genus of sea snails, marine gastropod mollusks in the family Neritidae.

Species
Species within the genus Bathynerita include:

 Bathynerita naticoidea Clarke, 1989

References

External links

Neritidae
Monotypic gastropod genera